Hermandad de Campoo de Suso is a municipality located in the autonomous community of Cantabria, Spain.  The municipality's seat is in Espinilla.

The Ebro River rises in this municipality, in the town of Fontibre.

Towns
Abiada
Argüeso
Barrio
Camino
Celada de los Calderones
Entrambasaguas
Espinilla (capital)
Fontibre
Hoz de Abiada
Izara
La Lomba
Mazandrero
La Miña
Naveda
Ormas
Paracuelles
Población de Suso
Proaño
Salces
La Serna
Soto
Suano
Villacantid
Villar

References

External links
Hermandad de Campoo de Suso - Cantabria 102 Municipios

Gallery

Municipalities in Cantabria